Esser Bluff is a rock bluff rising to about  on the southeast margin of Turks Head Ridge, Ross Island. At the suggestion of P.R. Kyle, it was named by the Advisory Committee on Antarctic Names (2000) after Richard Esser, a member of New Mexico Tech field parties on Mount Erebus in the 1993–94 and 1994–95 seasons, and later a technician in the New Mexico Geochronology Lab at NM Tech, where he has dated many rocks from Antarctica.

References 

Cliffs of Ross Island